Allium caespitosum is a plant species native to Xinjiang  and Kazakhstan in Central Asia. It grows in desert regions, very often in sandy locales.

Allium caespitosum produces clumps of small bulbs. Scapes are round in cross-section, up to 20 cm tall. Leaves are very narrow, shorter than the scape. Flowers are white or pale pink.

References

caespitosum
Onions
Flora of China
Flora of Xinjiang
Flora of Kazakhstan
Plants described in 1841